Tony Gum (born 1995) is a South African photographer. Gum was born in Kwa Langa township in Cape Town, Western Cape Province. She began her photographic career by posting selfies on Instagram; this amateur effort quickly developed into a professional art career. She was awarded the Miami Beach Pulse Prize in 2017.

References

1995 births
South African women photographers
Living people
21st-century South African women artists
South African photographers
21st-century photographers
People from Nelson Mandela Bay Metropolitan Municipality
21st-century women photographers